Georg Friedrich von Greiffenklau zu Vollrads (also spelled Greiffenclau; 8 September 1573 – 6 July 1629) was the Prince-Bishop of Worms from 1616 to 1629 and the Archbishop-Elector of Mainz from 1626 to 1629.

Biography
Georg Friedrich von Greiffenklau zu Vollrads was born in Schloss Vollrads on 8 September 1573.  He was educated at the Collegium Germanicum in Rome.  He then worked as an official in the Archbishopric of Mainz.

In 1616, the cathedral chapter of Worms Cathedral elected him to be Bishop of Worms.  The cathedral chapter of Mainz Cathedral elected him to also be Archbishop of Mainz in 1626.  As Archchancellor of the Holy Roman Empire, Georg Friedrich authored the Edict of Restitution in 1627.

He died in Mainz on 6 July 1629.

References

This page is based on this page on German Wikipedia.

Archbishop-Electors of Mainz
Collegium Germanicum et Hungaricum alumni
1573 births
1629 deaths
People from the Rheingau